No Compass Will Find Home is the fourth studio album from electronic musician Merz. It was released in January 2013 under Accidental Records, and produced by Matthew Herbert.

Track list

References

External links
No Compass Will Find Home by Merz at iTunes.com

2013 albums